Zdzisława Janowsk (née Chłodzińska; born 16 December 1940 in Łódź) is a Polish economist and politician, who has served as a senator in the Senate of Poland from 1993 to 1997 and again from 2001 to 2005, and was a member of the Sejm from 2007 to 2011. She is a professor of economics at the University of Łódź, and was awarded the Order of Polonia Restituta in 1999.

References 

1940 births
Living people
Polish politicians
Polish economists